Line 5 of the Saint Petersburg Metro, also known as Frunzensko-Primorskaya Line or Purple Line, is a newest rapid transit line in Saint Petersburg, Russia, opened in 2008, which connects the historical city centre to the northwestern and southern districts. Although it opened on 20 December 2008, parts of the line are considerably older. At its official opening in 2008, it included only two stations that opened concurrently with the line. On 7 March 2009, the Metro incorporated six existing stations of Line 4 (Pravoberezhnaya) into Line 5, expanding it to nine stations.

Admiralteyskaya station, which is the deepest station in Russia and one of the deepest in the world, at 86 metres, opened on this line 2011.

The line is named after the Primorsky district and Russian Bolshevik commander Mikhail Frunze.

History

History of construction 
Expansion plans that included the route of the current Line 5 first appeared in the 1980s. Construction began in 1987, but the collapse of the Soviet Union and the resultant financial crash forced the city to freeze the construction of the Frunzensky branch (the section south of Sadovaya). Sadovaya, which opened in 1991, is the oldest station on the line.

City officials decided to continue building the Primorsky branch (the section north of Sadovaya). Sportivnaya and Chkalovskaya opened in 1997, Staraya Derevnya and Krestovsky Ostrov opened in 1999, and Komendantsky Prospekt opened in 2005. The Metro incorporated these stations into the Line 4 (Pravoberezhnaya) once the Frunzensky branch was completed.

Subsequent to the formal opening of Line 5, and the connection of the Primorsky and Fruzensky branches in March 2009, Obvodny Kanal station was opened on the existing open section of line on 30 December 2010.  The long-awaited Admiralteyskaya station, serving many of the historic and tourist sites in the city, was opened on 28 December 2011, also on an existing open section of line.  Prior to this date, most trains bypassed this partially completed station, save for a few trains that dropped off and picked up construction workers.

Rolling Stock
The line currently has trains of 81-540/541 and the .2 and .5 modifications running since the opening.

Timeline

Future projects 
On the northern end of the line, three stations are planned namely Shuvalovsky Prospekt, Plesetskaya, Artseulovskaya and Kolomyazhskaya. They will be followed by another new depot.

References

Saint Petersburg Metro lines
Railway lines opened in 2008
2008 establishments in Russia